Traveller was a ship launched at Whitby in 1792. First she traded with the Baltic, then she was a London-based transport, next she traded between London and Quebec, and lastly she traded between England and the Baltic. She was lost in 1806 at Riga.

Career
Traveller first entered Lloyd's Register in the 1793 volume.

Fate
Traveller, Denning, master, arrived at Riga from London on 19 September 1806. Lloyd's List reported in November that Traveller, Denning, master, of Whitby, was one of four vessels reported to be on shore at Riga, all of which were totally lost. Another source gave the year of loss as 1807.

Citations and references
Citations

References
 

1792 ships
Ships built in Whitby
Age of Sail merchant ships of England
Maritime incidents in 1806